"Floods of Tears"/ is the debut single by L'Arc-en-Ciel, released on November 25, 1992. It was a limited release and only 1,000 copies were produced.

Track listing

Personnel 
 hyde – vocals
 ken – guitar
 tetsu – bass, backing vocals
 PERO – drums
 Kenji Shimizu – keyboards

External links
 Official website
 L'Arc-en-Ciel at Danger Crue Records

1992 debut singles
Japanese-language songs
L'Arc-en-Ciel songs
Torch songs
Songs written by Tetsuya (musician)
Songs written by Hyde (musician)
Songs written by Ken (musician)
1992 songs